The Luanzhou Mining Company (Lan-chou; Chinese: 滦州矿务公司) was a coal mining company in Luanzhou, Hebei Province, China. It was created by Zhou Xuexi in 1908 to compete with Kaiping Mines. The production began toward end of 1908.

References

Coal companies of China
Chinese companies established in 1908